This is a list of encyclopedic people associated with the University of Nevada, Las Vegas in the United States of America.

Academics

Arts and entertainment

Athletics

Baseball

Basketball

Football

Golf
 Chad Campbell (b. 1974), golfer
 Charley Hoffman (b. 1976), golfer
 Skip Kendall (b. 1964), golfer
 Ryan Moore (b. 1982), golfer
 Chris Riley (b. 1973), golfer
 Adam Scott (b. 1980), golfer

Soccer
 Rod Dyachenko (b. 1983), soccer player, currently with Samut Songkhram F.C.
 Lamar Neagle (b. 1987), soccer player, currently with Seattle Sounders FC
 Jennifer Ruiz (b. 1983), soccer player, formerly with Seattle Reign FC and currently head coach of the UNLV women's soccer team

Politics

Other

References

 
UNLV
Nevada